Geomyza tripunctata is a species of fly in the family Opomyzidae. It is found in the  Palearctic.

May to November. A herbicole found in grassland and cereal fields. Common throughout Europe. Norway and Lapland Siberia. Algeria.Tunisia. Found up to 2.300 m.. The larvae tunnel in the stems of grasses and cereal.

References

External links
Images representing Geomyza tripunctata at BOLD
images at EOL

Opomyzidae
Insects described in 1823
Muscomorph flies of Europe